Zelkow may refer to the following places in Poland:
Zelków, Lesser Poland Voivodeship (south Poland)
Żelków, Masovian Voivodeship (east-central Poland)